Server Reshatovich Djeparov (Uzbek: Server Jeparov, Uzbek Cyrillic: Сервер Жепаров, ; born 3 October 1982), is an Uzbek former professional football playmaker who is the head coach of Uzbekistan U-14 and the assistant coach of Uzbekistan. He has won the Asian Footballer of the Year award twice, first in 2008 and the other in 2011.

Club career

Early career
 He began his football career with Navbahor Namangan in 1997 at the age of 15.

Navbahor Namangan
He started his professional career with Navbahor Namangan in 2000, scoring 7 goals in 46 matches.

Pakhtakor
In 2002, he was transferred to Pakhtakor Tashkent, where he scored 34 goals in 96 matches. From 2002 to 2007 he won six Uzbek League championships and six Uzbek Cups.

Bunyodkor
In 2008, he was transferred to Bunyodkor. Djeparov scored 19 goals for the team in his first season, which made him the top goalscorer of the club and the 2008 Uzbek League. His team won its first ever Uzbek League title that year. For his instrumental role in Bunyodkor and the Uzbekistan national football team, he was awarded the Asian Footballer of the Year. As a part of an agreement with the Asian Football Confederation, Djeparov was offered to a month in trial with Premier League giants Chelsea. However, Bunyodkor's matches in the Uzbek League championship and the Asian Champions League meant that he was unable to attend. Anyway, this season is often described as the best season of his career.

FC Seoul
In July 2010, Djeparov was loaned out to FC Seoul of the K League 1 until the end of season on his own request. He scored his K League 1 debut goal in a 2–0 victory against Incheon United on October 2, 2010. He posted 1 goal and 7 assists in 16 matches in the K League 1 that season, playing an instrumental role in Seoul's first K League win in 10 years. On February 8, 2011, Seoul announced that they had made the move permanent for an undisclosed fee rumored to be about US$850,000, and signed a 3-year contract with Djeparov.

Al Shabab
After playing 15 games in Seoul, he was transferred to Al Shabab FC of the Saudi Premier League. The deal was announced at July 9, 2011. He was unremarkable on the pitch, and was rumored to be unhappy with his limited playing opportunities and Saudi Arabia's weather.

Seongnam Ilhwa Chunma / Seongnam FC

In February 2013 he made a move to Seongnam Ilhwa Chunma of the K League 1.

In January 2014 Seongnam Ilhwa Chunma was purchased from the Tongil Group by Seongnam City Government. Seongnam City Government made major changes to the club, which included renaming it Seongnam FC. As Ivan Vuković, the previous owner of the number 10 jersey, decided to change his number to 32, Djeparov decided to take the vacant number 10 of team.

Esteghlal
On 15 January 2017, Djeparov completed his move to Esteghlal. He signed an internal one and half year contract worth $500,000 including bonuses, however his internal contract could not be registered with Esteghlal due to a FIFA imposed transfer ban. Later he joined Sepahan on loan until the end of the season.

Sepahan (loan)
Djeparov made his debut for Sepahan in a 3–0 defeat against Machine Sazi on 9 February 2017. On 5 March, he scored his first goal for Sepahan against city rivals Zob Ahan. After his loan at Sepahan expired it was originally reported that Djeparov would not return to Esteghlal, however after negotiations between the player and the club, Djeparov announced he will return to Esteghlal.

Return to Esteghlal

On 28 June 2017, he made his debut for Esteghlal in the 1–0 defeat against Sanat Naft Abadan entering as a substitute for Hassan Beyt Saeed. On 11 August, he scored his first goal for Esteghlal in the 1–0 win against Tractor Sazi, a screamer which was 30 yards away from the goal. Uzbekistan Football Federation praised his goal on their official Instagram later. On 6 December, he scored his first brace for the club in a 3–0 victory against his previous club Sepahan. His first goal at the Hazfi Cup wascame in a 3–0 win against Iranjavan on 20 December 2017. He also played in the final of the competition, won 1–0 against Khooneh be Khooneh.

On 31 December 2017, Djeparov was ranked the 20th best player of Asia by Football Tribe's website. He was also named as the Persian Gulf Pro League's top assister of the year at the end of the season.

On 26 July 2018 Esteghlal chairman Amirhossein Fathi announced that Djeparov will leave the club after the parties could not agree on the terms to renew his contract.

FC Zhetysu
On 26 July 2018, Djeparov joined Kazakh side Zhetysu until the end of season. He made his debut in the League on 16 September in an away match with FC Tobol and scored equalized with a penalty 2–2, he played 290 minute.

Metallurg Bekabad
Djeparov joined Metallurg Bekabad in January 2019.

International career
Djeparov has made 128 appearances and scored 25 goals for the senior Uzbekistan national team since May 2002 until September 2017. In 2011, he became the captain of the Uzbekistan and posted 2 goals and 2 assists in the 2011 AFC Asian Cup, leading his side to its first ever semifinals in the cup.

Managerial career
Djeparov was named the head coach of Uzbekistan U-14 on 28 January 2020. Seven months later, he became the assistant coach of Uzbekistan.

Personal life
Djeparov is of Crimean Tatar and Russian descent and speaks fluent Russian, as well as comprehensible English, but only barely speaks Uzbek.

He has a son, Raul, who is part of the Bunyodkor Academy. Raul was named after Real Madrid legend Raúl. A few years before, his daughter Veronika was born.

Club statistics

Club

Matches in Saudi Crown Prince Cup
Matches in King Cup of Champions
Matches in Korean FA Cup

International goals
Scores and results list Uzbekistan's goals tally first.

Honours

Club
Pakhtakor
 Uzbek League: 2002, 2003, 2004, 2005, 2006, 2007
 Uzbek Cup: 2002, 2003, 2004, 2005, 2006, 2007
 CIS Cup: 2007

Bunyodkor
 Uzbek League: 2008, 2009
 Uzbek Cup: 2008

FC Seoul
 K League 1: 2010
 League Cup: 2010

Al Shabab
 Saudi Professional League: 2012

Seongnam FC
 FA Cup: 2014

Lokomotiv
 Uzbek League: 2016
 Uzbek Cup: 2016

Esteghlal
 Hazfi Cup: 2017–18

Individual 
 CIS Cup top goalscorer: 2007 (shared)
 Uzbek League Topscorer: 2008 (19 goals)
 Uzbekistan Footballer of the Year: 2008, 2010
 AFC Asian Footballer of the Year: 2008, 2011
 AFC Asian Cup Individual Quality Player: 2011
 Persian Gulf Pro League top assister of the Year: 2018
 AFC Asian Cup Fans' All Time Best XI: 2018
 Uzbekistan's AFC Champions League Legend

See also
 List of men's footballers with 100 or more international caps

References

External links

 

1982 births
Living people
Uzbekistani footballers
Uzbekistan international footballers
2004 AFC Asian Cup players
2007 AFC Asian Cup players
2011 AFC Asian Cup players
2015 AFC Asian Cup players
Pakhtakor Tashkent FK players
FC Bunyodkor players
Esteghlal F.C. players
Navbahor Namangan players
FC Seoul players
Al-Shabab FC (Riyadh) players
Seongnam FC players
Ulsan Hyundai FC players
PFK Metallurg Bekabad players
Uzbekistan Super League players
K League 1 players
Saudi Professional League players
Persian Gulf Pro League players
Expatriate footballers in Iran
Expatriate footballers in South Korea
Expatriate footballers in Saudi Arabia
Uzbekistani expatriate footballers
Uzbekistani expatriate sportspeople in Saudi Arabia
Uzbekistani expatriate sportspeople in South Korea
Uzbekistani expatriate sportspeople in Iran
Uzbekistani people of Crimean Tatar descent
Crimean Tatar sportspeople
Uzbekistani people of Russian descent
Asian Footballer of the Year winners
FIFA Century Club
Footballers at the 2006 Asian Games
Association football midfielders
Asian Games competitors for Uzbekistan
Uzbekistani football managers
PFC Lokomotiv Tashkent managers